Take Three is an Australian television series which aired from 1961 to 1962 on ABC. A live 30-minute variety series with music and comedy, it featured Sheila Bradley, Bill French, Bob Hornery, and Johnny Ladd and Frank Camm. The first episode aired 17 March 1961.

References

External links
Take Three on IMDb

1961 Australian television series debuts
1962 Australian television series endings
Black-and-white Australian television shows
English-language television shows
Australian live television series
Australian variety television shows
Australian Broadcasting Corporation original programming